Cazeneuve may refer to:

People
André Cazeneuve (died 1874), French soldier in Japanese service
Bernard Cazeneuve (born 1963), French prime minister
Jean Cazeneuve (1915–2005), French sociologist and anthropologist.
Louis Cazeneuve (1908–1977), Argentine-American comic-book artist
Marguerite Cazeneuve (born 1988), French political adviser
Paul Cazeneuve (1852–1934), French politician
Pierre Cazeneuve (born 1995), French politician

Places
Allez-et-Cazeneuve, a commune in the Lot-et-Garonne department in southwestern France
Cazeneuve-Montaut, a commune in the Haute-Garonne department in southwestern France
Cazeneuve, Gers, a commune in the Gers department in southwestern France
Château de Cazeneuve, a château in France

Other
Cazeneuve (company), French machine tool manufacturing company
Cazeneuve Government, the thirty-ninth Government of France, led by Prime Minister Bernard Cazeneuve